Godless: The Eastfield Exorcism (also known as In God's Care) is a 2023 Australian horror film directed by Nick Kozakis and written by Alexander Angliss-Wilson. It stars Georgia Eyers, Dan Ewing, Tim Pocock, Rosie Traynor and Eliza Matengu.

Godless: The Eastfield Exorcism premiered in the Philippines on 8 March 2023, and is set to have its world premiere at the 2023 Overlook Film Festival. It is slated for release on video-on-demand (VOD) and digital platforms in North America on 6 April 2023.

Cast
 Georgia Eyers as Lara
 Dan Ewing as Ron Levonde
 Tim Pocock as Daniel
 Rosie Traynor as Barbara
 Eliza Matengu as Dr. Marsa Walsh

Production
Filming took place in the Shire of Hepburn in Victoria, Australia, in late 2021.

Release
On 2 March 2023, it was announced that XYZ Films had acquired the North American distribution rights to Godless: The Eastfield Exorcism. On 7 March, an official trailer for the film was released on YouTube.

Godless: The Eastfield Exorcism premiered in the Philippines on 8 March 2023, playing at SM Cinema theatres. The film is set to have its world premiere at the Overlook Film Festival in New Orleans, Louisiana, United States, between 30 March and 2 April 2023. It is scheduled for release on video-on-demand (VOD) and digital platforms in North America on 6 April 2023.

References

External links
 

2020s English-language films
2023 horror films
2023 films
Australian horror films
Films about exorcism
Crime horror films
Films shot in Victoria (Australia)